Baron Maurice Jules Marie Emmanuel Eleuthère Houtart (1866–1939) was a Belgian politician.

Family 
Maurice was born the son of Baron Jules Houtart (1844-1928). He married Marcelle Jooris (1878-1924), daughter of Emile Jooris, the mayor of Vardenare, with whom he had one son. Descendants through his son are still living. He published a history of his family. From 1934 he lived in the Château de Gesves.

Career 
In 1889, having acquired a doctorate in law, he became a lawyer. Later he became active in politics. He was sent to the Hague Conference.

During his political career he was Minister of Finance and Minister of the Colonies, as well as director of the Bank of Brussels.

Honours 
 1932: 
 Minister of State, by royal Decree
 Knight Grand Cross in the Order of the Crown.
 Commander in the Order of Leopold

Books 
 Maurice Houtart, "Généalogie Houtart", in: Annuaire de la noblesse de Belgique, Brussels, 1893.
 Maurice Houtart, Généalogie de la famille Houtart, 1923.
 Maurice Houtart, "Le village de Gesves durant huit siècles, 1000-1800", Annales de la Société archéologique de Namur, 1935.

References

External links 
 Maurice Houtart in ODIS - Online Database for Intermediary Structures

Barons of Belgium
Grand Crosses of the Order of the Crown (Belgium)
Finance ministers of Belgium
Belgian Ministers of State
1866 births
1939 deaths
Belgian genealogists